J. Sidney Levine (died December 22, 1955) was an American lawyer and politician from New York.

Life
He was born in Brooklyn, New York City. He attended Boys High School, and graduated LL.B. from Brooklyn Law School.

Levine was a member of the New York State Assembly (Kings Co., 2nd D.) from 1945 until his death in 1955, sitting in the 165th, 166th, 167th, 168th, 169th and 170th New York State Legislatures.

He died on December 22, 1955.

Sources

Year of birth missing
1955 deaths
Politicians from Brooklyn
Democratic Party members of the New York State Assembly
Brooklyn Law School alumni
Boys High School (Brooklyn) alumni